Torrice is a comune (municipality) in the Province of Frosinone in the Italian region Lazio, located about  southeast of Rome and about  east of Frosinone.

Torrice borders the following municipalities: Arnara, Boville Ernica, Frosinone, Ripi, Veroli.

History 
Founded in the Middle Ages, the city was subjected to the authority of the papal authority. In 1870, it was therefore annexed to the kingdom and in 1927 it became part of the province of Frosinone.

References

Cities and towns in Lazio